John Littleton Dawson (February 7, 1813 – September 18, 1870) was a Democratic member of the U.S. House of Representatives from Pennsylvania.

Early life and education
Dawson was born in Uniontown, Pennsylvania and grew up in Brownsville, Pennsylvania. He graduated from Washington College with a degree in law, was granted admission to the bar in 1835, and ran a small law practice. He served as deputy attorney general for Fayette County, Pennsylvania in 1838, and as district attorney for the western district of Pennsylvania from 1845 until 1848.

Political career
In 1848 he unsuccessfully ran for congress as a Democrat, but on subsequent attempts he was elected and served in the 32nd and 33rd congresses, from March 4, 1851 until March 3, 1855, when he stepped down, declining the nomination for the next term. While serving as a congressman he was the chairman of the Committee on Agriculture.

During his time away from congress, President Franklin Pierce offered him the governorship of Kansas Territory, but he declined so that he could run for congress again, which he was elected to again in 1863, and served on the 38th and 39th congresses from March 4, 1863 until March 3, 1867.  His vote on the Thirteenth Amendment is recorded as nay.

He was a delegate to Democratic National Convention from Pennsylvania, 1844, 1848, 1860, 1868.

He retired to his home in Springfield Township, Fayette County, Pennsylvania where he died at age 57. He was interred at Christ Episcopal Churchyard in Brownsville.

In 1860 he was honored as the namesake of Dawson County, Nebraska in what was then Nebraska Territory.

Sources

The Political Graveyard
Infoplease: John Littleton Dawson biography
Nebraska State Historical Society timeline  http://www.nebraskahistory.org/publish/publicat/timeline/dawson-john-l.htm

1813 births
1870 deaths
Washington & Jefferson College alumni
People from Fayette County, Pennsylvania
People from Uniontown, Pennsylvania
Democratic Party members of the United States House of Representatives from Pennsylvania
United States Attorneys for the Western District of Pennsylvania
19th-century American politicians